"" ("O fir tree"), known in English as "O Christmas Tree", is a German Christmas song. Based on a traditional folk song which was unrelated to Christmas, it became associated with the traditional Christmas tree.

History
The modern lyrics were written in 1824 by the Leipzig organist, teacher and composer Ernst Anschütz. A Tannenbaum is a fir tree. The lyrics do not actually refer to Christmas, or describe a decorated Christmas tree. Instead, they refer to the fir's evergreen quality as a symbol of constancy and faithfulness.

Anschütz based his text on a 16th-century Silesian folk song by Melchior Franck, "". August Zarnack in 1819 wrote a tragic love song inspired by this folk song, taking the evergreen, "faithful" fir tree as contrasting with a faithless lover. The folk song first became associated with Christmas with Anschütz, who added two verses of his own to the first, traditional verse. The custom of the Christmas tree developed in the course of the 19th century, and the song came to be seen as a Christmas carol. Anschütz's version still had  (true, faithful) as the adjective describing the fir's leaves (needles), harking back to the contrast to the faithless maiden of the folk song.

Melody 

The tune is an old folk tune attested in the 16th century. It is also known as the tune of "" and of "".

Lyrics

Other uses

The tune has also been used (as a contrafactum) to carry other texts on many occasions. Notable uses include:
 "The Red Flag", anthem of the British and Irish Labour Parties
 Florida – "Florida, My Florida", former state song
 Maryland – "Maryland, My Maryland", former state song
 Michigan – "Michigan, My Michigan", widely believed to be the official state song
 Iowa – "The Song of Iowa", official state song
 Labrador – "Ode to Labrador", regional anthem
 Dickinson College's alma mater, "Noble Dickinsonia," with words written by Horatio Collins King.
 The College of the Holy Cross's alma mater is sung to the tune of "O Tannenbaum".
 When traveling by bus, schoolchildren in Sweden sing "En busschaufför" (Swedish for "a bus driver") or "Vår busschaufför" ("Our bus driver") to the melody.
 St. Bonaventure University alma mater, "With Myrtle Wreath We'll Deck Thy Brow"
 "Scout Vespers", used by the Boy Scouts of America, is sung to the melody. Similarly, "Softly Falls" in which used by the Girl Scouts of the USA, is sung to the melody, as referenced in the song "On My Honor".

See also
 List of Christmas carols

References

External links

"Eglite" – old recording of the song and article from The Hermann von Helmholtz Center for Cultural Technology 
Notes "O Tannenbaum" (sheet music in GIF)
"O Tannenbaum" multilingual – MIDI and lyrics for "O Tannenbaum" and "O Christmas Tree"
Sheet music in JPEG format, MIDI, and lyrics to "O Tannenbaum"
Lyrics and MP3 of "O Christmas Tree" by the Layaways
Free-scores.com

German-language Christmas carols
Christmas in Germany
Volkslied
Songs about trees
1824 songs
Songwriter unknown